Kalateh-ye Reza (also Romanized as Kalāteh-ye Reẕā; also known as Kalāteh-ye Bachchehhā, Kalāteh, and Kalāteh-ye Karbalā’ī-ye Ḩoseynī) is a village in Rezqabad Rural District, in the Central District of Esfarayen County, North Khorasan Province, Iran. At the 2006 census, its population was 147, in 38 families.

References 

Populated places in Esfarayen County